Members of the British Liberal Party's Frontbench Team from 1967 to 1976 (leaderships listed chronologically):

Party Spokesmen under Jeremy Thorpe's First Parliament January 1967–June 1970
Mr. Thorpe announced changes in the organisation of the Parliamentary Liberal Party, and the reallocation of duties among the 12 Liberal M Ps. Mr. Jo Grimond. who resigned as Leader of the party last month. has been invited to undertake a general oversight of foreign affairs. defence, and regionalism. His sphere will Include a study of present Common Market trends. East-West Euroman relations,, the future of Nato and its relationship with the Warsaw Pact powers, and Highland development. 

Mr. Eric Lubbock. Liberal Whip. will have responsibility for science and technology. power. aviation, housing. public building. land and  natural resources. 

Duties have been allocated among the other MPs as follows: 

Mr. Peter Bessell (Bodmin): trade. transport. second spokesman on land and housing. 
Mr. James Davidson (Aberdeen West): foreign affairs. defence. 
Mr. Emlyn Hooson (Montgomery): Wales, law. second spokesman on defence, and Home Office. 
Mr. Russell Johnston (Invernen): Scottish affairs. Scottish WWI). 
Mr. A. R. McKenzie (Ross and Cromarty): agnculture. 
Mr. J. W. Pardoe (Cornwall North): West Country affairs. education. social security. 
Mr. David Steel (Roxbinth : Selkirk and Peebles): Perlis. mentary aide to Mr. Thorpe. Commonwealth affairs. overseas development. 
Mr. Richard Wainwright ((Colne Valley): Treasury. labour, economic affairs. 
Dr. Michael Winstanley (Cheadle,: Rome °Mee. health. Post °Mee. ...

(Source: British Newspaper Archive, Birmingham Post)

Changes
June 1969: Upon election to the house, Wallace Lawler becomes Chief Spokesman for Pensions and Housing

Party Spokesmen under Jeremy Thorpe's Second Parliament June 1970–February 1974
Jeremy Thorpe: Party Leader
David Steel: Chief Whip
John Pardoe: Chief Treasury Spokesman 
Changes 

1973: On election Alan Beith becomes home affairs spokesman

Party Spokesmen under Jeremy Thorpe's Third Parliament February 1974–October 1974
Jeremy Thorpe: Party Leader
David Steel: Chief Whip, Chief Spokesman for Foreign Affairs and Commonwealth
John Pardoe: Chief Treasury Spokesman
Alan Beith: Chief Home Affairs Spokesman

Party Spokesmen under Jeremy Thorpe's Fourth Parliament October 1974–May 1976
Jeremy Thorpe: Party Leader
David Steel: Chief Whip, Chief Spokesman for Foreign Affairs and Commonwealth
John Pardoe: Chief Treasury Spokesman 
Alan Beith: Chief Home Spokesman

Changes
1975: Cyril Smith becomes Chief Whip

Party Spokesmen under Jo Grimond's Interim Leadership May 1976–July 1976
Jo Grimond: Interim Party Leader
Cyril Smith: Chief Whip
John Pardoe: Chief Treasury Spokesman
David Steel: Chief Spokesman for Foreign Affairs and Commonwealth
Alan Beith: Chief Spokesman for Home Affairs 

Liberal Party (UK)
20th century in the United Kingdom
1967 establishments in the United Kingdom
1976 disestablishments in the United Kingdom